Moczadła may refer to:

Moczadła, Brodnica County, Poland
Moczadła, Lipno County, Poland